Patrick Hughes (March 26, 1831 – March 24, 1899) was an Irish-born merchant and political figure in Ontario, Canada. He represented Niagara in the House of Commons of Canada from 1878 to 1879 as a Liberal member.

He was born in Newry, County Down, the son of Bernard Hughes and Anne Fegan, and came to Toronto with his family in 1847. Hughes entered the dry goods business with his brother Bernard under the combined name of Hughes Brothers. He was married twice: to Mary Eliza Donohoe in 1857 and to Margaret Louise Sheridan in 1876. Hughes served as a member of Toronto city council in 1877 and 1878. He was elected to the House of Commons in the 1878 federal election for the riding of Niagara, defeating the incumbent Josiah Burr Plumb; his election was overturned on appeal the following year and he lost the subsequent by-election to Plumb. He was a director of the Imperial Bank in Toronto, the Bristol and West of England Loan and Investment Company and the Toronto Savings Bank.

References 
 
The Canadian parliamentary companion and annual register, 1879 CH Mackintosh

1831 births
1899 deaths
Members of the House of Commons of Canada from Ontario
Liberal Party of Canada MPs